Murray Phillips is a Professor in the School of Human Movement and Nutrition Sciences at the University of Queensland. His research interests lie in sport and its history, examining its ontological, epistemological and methodological aspects. In conjunction with “Paralympic Stories”, Murray is writing a book on the history of Australia's Paralympic movement.

Selected publications
 Phillips, M., 1997. An illusory image: A report on the media coverage and portrayal of women's sport in Australia. Australian Sports Commission.
 Phillips, M.G., 2001. Deconstructing sport history: The postmodern challenge. Journal of Sport History, 28(3), pp. 327–343.
 Phillips, M.G., 2016. Wikipedia and history: a worthwhile partnership in the digital era?. Rethinking History, 20(4), pp. 523–543.

References

Australian historians
Sports historians
Living people
Year of birth missing (living people)